The 6th Duke of Connaught's Royal Canadian Hussars was a light cavalry regiment of the Non-Permanent Active Militia of the Canadian Militia (now the Canadian Army). First formed in 1855 as an independent cavalry troop, in 1879 it became a full regiment and was the oldest cavalry regiment in Montreal. In 1958, the regiment was amalgamated with the 17th Duke of York's Royal Canadian Hussars to form The Royal Canadian Hussars (Montreal).

Lineage

6th Duke of Connaught's Royal Canadian Hussars 

 Originated on 14 November 1879, in Montreal, as the 6th Provisional Regiment of Cavalry.
 Redesignated on 18 September 1885, as the 6th Regiment of Cavalry.
 Redesignated on 20 June 1890, as the 6th Regiment of Cavalry “Duke of Connaught's Royal Canadian Hussars”.
 Redesignated on 1 January 1893, as the 6th “Duke of Connaught's Royal Canadian Hussars”.
 Amalgamated on 1 June 1901, with the 5th Dragoons and redesignated as the 6th Duke of Connaught's Royal Canadian Hussars.
 Amalgamated on 15 December 1936, with the 1st Armoured Car Regiment and redesignated as the 6th Duke of Connaught's Royal Canadian Hussars (Armoured Car).
 Redesignated on 27 February 1941, as the 2nd (Reserve) Regiment, 6th Duke of Connaught's Royal Canadian Hussars (Armoured Car).
 Redesignated on 1 April 1941, as the 15th (Reserve) Armoured Regiment, (6th Duke of Connaught's Royal Canadian Hussars).
 Redesignated on 4 February 1949, as the 6th Duke of Connaught's Royal Canadian Hussars (15th Armoured Regiment).
 Redesignated on 19 May 1958, as the 6th Duke of Connaught's Royal Canadian Hussars.
 Amalgamated on 16 September 1958, with the 17th Duke of York's Royal Canadian Hussars and redesignated as The Royal Canadian Hussars (Montreal).

5th Dragoons 

 Originated on 30 November 1877, in Cookshire, Quebec, as the 5th Provisional Regiment of Cavalry.
 Redesignated on 21 May 1886, as the 5th Regiment of Cavalry.
 Redesignated on 1 January 1893, as the 5th Dragoons.
 Amalgamated on 1 June 1901, with the 6th "Duke of Connaught's Royal Canadian Hussars" and redesignated as the 6th Duke of Connaught's Royal Canadian Hussars.

1st Armoured Car Regiment 

 Originated on 1 June 1919, in Montreal, as the 1st Motor Machine Gun Brigade, CMGC.
 Redesignated on 1 October 1936, as the 1st Armoured Car Regiment.
 Amalgamated on 15 December 1936, with the 6th Duke of Connaught's Royal Canadian Hussars and redesignated as the 6th Duke of Connaught's Royal Canadian Hussars (Armoured Car).

Perpetuations 

 1st Canadian Motor Machine Gun Brigade, CEF

Alliances 

  – 8th King's Royal Irish Hussars (1936–1958)

Battle Honours 

 Mount Sorrel
 Somme, 1916, '18
 Flers-Courcelette
 Thiepval
 Arras, 1917, '18
 Vimy, 1917
 Hill 70
 Ypres, 1917
 Passchendaele
 Baupaume, 1918
 Rosières
 Avre
 Amiens
 Scarpe, 1918
 Drocourt-Quéant
 Hindenburg Line
 Canal du Nord
 Cambrai, 1918
 Valenciennes
 Sambre
 France And Flanders, 1915–18

Notable Members 

 Brigadier-General Charles Allan Smart 
 Ben Weider 
 Lieutenant-Colonel George Harold Baker
 Chaplain John Macpherson Almond

See also 

 List of regiments of cavalry of the Canadian Militia (1900–1920)

References 

6th Duke of Connaught's Royal Canadian Hussars
Hussar regiments of Canada
Military units and formations of Quebec
Military units and formations disestablished in 1958